The Breda A.1 was a touring aircraft developed in Italy in 1924.

Design
The Breda A.1 was a conventional two-seat, single engine biplane with a fixed bogie. The Colombo 110 engine was positioned at the front apex of the fuselage combined with a two-blade wooden propeller with fixed pitch.

The A.1 was intended for the civil aviation tourism market, and several aircraft of this type were constructed.

Specifications

References 

A.1
1920s Italian civil trainer aircraft
Biplanes
Single-engined tractor aircraft
Aircraft first flown in 1924